The 1988 women's Olympic volleyball tournament was the seventh edition of the event, organised by the world's governing body, the FIVB in conjunction with the International Olympic Committee. The competition in Seoul, South Korea was held from 20 to 29 September 1988.

Qualification

* Notes:
1. Cuba was the 1986 World Championship runners-up (champions China, were already qualified as 1984 Olympic champions), but together with other countries, boycotted the games.
2. Brazil replaced Cuba.
3. Japan was the 1987 Asian Championsnip runners-up (champions China, were already qualified as 1984 Olympic champions).
4. United States was the 1987 NORCECA Championsnip runners-up (champions Cuba, were already qualified as 1986 World Championship runners-up).

Format
The tournament was played in two different stages. A single round-robin format was played within each pool to determine the teams position in the pool. The  (second stage) was played in a single elimination format, where the preliminary round two highest ranked teams in each group advanced to the semifinals and the two lowest ranked teams advanced to the 5th–8th place semifinals.

Pools composition

Squads

Venues
 Jamsil Gymnasium, Seoul, South Korea
 Saemaul Sports Hall, Seoul, South Korea
 Hanyang University Gymnasium, Seoul, South Korea

Preliminary round

Group A

|}

|}

Group B

|}

|}

Final round

5th to 8th place

5th–8th place semifinals

|}

7th place match

|}

5th place match

|}

Final

Semifinals

|}

Bronze medal match

|}

Gold medal match

|}

Final standings

Medalists

See also
Men's Olympic Tournament

References

External links
Results
Final standings (1964–2000) at FIVB.org
Official results (pgs. 625–627, 635–638)

O
Volleyball at the 1988 Summer Olympics
Women's volleyball in South Korea
1988 in South Korean women's sport
Vol